Naïade was an unprotected cruiser of the French Navy that was built in the late 1870s and early 1880s.

Design
Four vessels were ordered, including Naïade; the vessels were dated designs more similar to the first screw frigates that had been built in the 1850s than the latest protected cruisers being designed abroad.

Eynaud's work incorporated features of the British corvette , the plans for which had been given to France by Britain. Albert Gicquel des Touches, the Minister of the Navy, and Vice Admiral Albert Roussin made several alterations to Eynaud's design, including improvements to the machinery, more modern guns, substitution of iron for wood in the hull construction, and the addition of watertight compartments. The updated plan was approved on 4 February 1878.

Characteristics
She displaced . Her hull was constructed with wood; she had a clipper bow and an overhanging stern. She had a forecastle and sterncastle. The ship had no armor protection. Her crew consisted of 496 officers and enlisted men.

The ship was propelled by a single horizontal, 3-cylinder compound steam engine that drove a screw propeller. Steam was provided by eight coal-burning fire-tube boilers that were ducted into a single funnel located amidships. To supplement her steam engines, she was fitted with a three-masted full ship rig.

As originally built, the ship was armed with a main battery of four  M1870 21-caliber (cal.) guns; two were placed in embrasures in the bow as chase guns, and the other pair were at the stern. These were supported by a secondary battery of sixteen  M1870 21.3-cal. guns in a broadside battery, eight guns per side. In addition, she carried a pair of  torpedo tubes above the waterline; these were on moveable carriages that were typically placed in broadside ports just ahead of the battery, but could be moved to launching ports in the bow or stern.

The ship's armament underwent several alterations over the course of her career. As completed in 1883, the two stern 165 mm guns were replaced with 138.6 M1870M 21.3-cal. guns, and ten of the battery guns were replaced with the updated M1870M variants. Ten  guns were added to provide close-range defense against torpedo boats. In 1886, the remaining 164.7 mm guns were replaced with M1881 guns of the same caliber, but they were moved down a deck level. A pair of  guns and a single  gun were added in 1890, and three 37 mm M1885 quick-firing guns were installed in 1894.

Service history

The new ship was ordered on 24 January 1878 and the keel for Naïade was laid down on 25 February at the Arsenal de Brest. She was launched on 6 January 1881 and was commissioned to begin sea trials in June 1882. The initial testing revealed significant problems with her engines. She was placed in reserve for modifications on 9 August, before being recommissioned on 20 February 1883. She carried out further trials, which lasted until 11 May. The ship was pronounced complete and then reduced to reserve status on 1 June.

On 10 August 1883, Naïade was recommissioned for an overseas deployment. She was sent to French Madagascar to replace the old cruiser . Naïade remained there for the next three years, patrolling the region and protecting French interests in the Indian Ocean. The ships were supported by a pair of transport vessels. Later that year, she was relieved by the cruiser .

After Naïade returned to France, she was modernized slightly and thereafter used for training. The navy considered replacing the ship's M1870 guns with improved M1870M guns during another refit in 1892, but the proposal came to nothing. Instead, she received eight new Belleville boilers. She was struck from the naval register on 1 December 1899 and was then sold on 29 March 1900 to a M. Pitel of Brest, France, where she was subsequently broken up.

Notes

References
 
 
 
 
 
 

Cruisers of the French Navy
Ships built in France
1881 ships